Mundada (Mundada, Mundada, Mundhada) is a surname of the Marwari Maheshwari community of Hindus.

Description
Mundadas are typically members business community, and have a wide area of operation in India and abroad. As the Maheshwaris are Shaivisms, so are Mundadas. Therefore meat eating and alcohol are prohibited.

Indian castes